Edward Spitzka may refer to:

 Edward Anthony Spitzka (1876–1922), American anatomist
 Edward Charles Spitzka (1852–1914), American alienist, neurologist and anatomist